Peter Baldwin may refer to:

Peter Baldwin (actor) (1933–2015), English actor
Peter Baldwin (director) (1931–2017), American television director
Peter Baldwin (politician) (born 1951), Australian politician
Peter Baldwin (professor) (born 1956), American historian
Peter Baldwin (footballer) (born 1968), Australian rules footballer